Emmet School District was a school district based in Emmet, Arkansas.

It was administratively divided between an elementary school and a high school.

On July 1, 2004, it consolidated into the Blevins School District.

References

External links
 

Defunct school districts in Arkansas
Education in Nevada County, Arkansas
2004 disestablishments in Arkansas
School districts disestablished in 2004